The Ministry of the Arts, Culture, the Civil Service and Sport (German: Bundesministerium für Kunst, Kultur, öffentlichen Dienst und Sport or BMKÖDS) is the government ministry of Austria in charge of the arts and sport as well as public administration and personnel questions that do not fall within the jurisdiction of another ministry. It bears responsibility for the management of museums and theatres, the maintenance of landmarks and historical sites, and the promotion of Austrian cinema.

History 

Even though the Republic of Austria has always had a large public sector and a considerable number of career civil servants, the country does not usually maintain a dedicated civil service ministry. Traditionally, the interest of Austria's civil servants (Beamte) were protected by their strong union (the Beamtengewerkschaft) and by the fact that civil servants were overrepresented among the upper ranks of every major political party. Public employment policy was set, and public employment law written, by the Chancellery and the Ministry of Finance.

A precursor of the current Ministry called the Ministry of Public Services and Sports (Bundesministerium für öffentliche Leistungen und Sport) was established by the Schüssel I cabinet in 2000, then unceremoniously disestablished by the Schüssel II cabinet in 2003. Its responsibilities were attached to the Chancellery.  The Ministry was resurrected by the First Kurz cabinet in 2018 as Federal Ministry of the Civil Service and Sport. On 29 January 2020, it was renamed Federal Ministry for Arts, Culture, the Civil Service and Sport by the Second Kurz government.

Responsibilities

Structure 

Since January 2020, the ministry consists of the Minister and his or her personal staff (Kabinett), the office of the general secretary, and four departments:
 Presidium (Sektion I − Präsidialangelegenheiten) 
 Sports (Sektion II − Sport)
 Civil service and administration innovation (Sektion III − Öffentlicher Dienst und Verwaltungsinnovation)
 Arts and Culture (Sektion IV – Kunst und Kultur)

The Minister and his or her staff are political appointees; the general secretary and the section heads are career civil servants.

Ministers

References

External links 
 Official web site 

Government of Austria
Arts Culture Civil Service and Sports
Austria
Austria
Lists of government ministers of Austria